Spencerville is a semi-rural town on the east coast of Canterbury, New Zealand north of Christchurch. The town backs on to Bottle Lake Forest and includes a large (1 hectare) park and 80 hectare camping ground. These amenities, as well as wetlands and an animal and bird park make the town a popular camping area for Christchurch residents.

After the 2011 Christchurch earthquake, the New Zealand Government classified Spencerville land as Technical Category T3. This requires repairers, builders and developers to meet stricter building standards.

Demographics
It is part of the wider Brooklands-Spencerville statistical area.

Spencerville had a population of 513 at the 2018 New Zealand census, an increase of 6 people (1.2%) since the 2013 census, and a decrease of 63 people (-10.9%) since the 2006 census. There were 165 households. There were 264 males and 255 females, giving a sex ratio of 1.04 males per female, with 111 people (21.6%) aged under 15 years, 108 (21.1%) aged 15 to 29, 249 (48.5%) aged 30 to 64, and 45 (8.8%) aged 65 or older.

Ethnicities were 91.2% European/Pākehā, 13.5% Māori, 4.1% Pacific peoples, 4.1% Asian, and 2.9% other ethnicities (totals add to more than 100% since people could identify with multiple ethnicities).

Although some people objected to giving their religion, 56.7% had no religion, 34.5% were Christian, 0.6% were Hindu, 0.6% were Buddhist and 2.3% had other religions.

Of those at least 15 years old, 90 (22.4%) people had a bachelor or higher degree, and 60 (14.9%) people had no formal qualifications. The employment status of those at least 15 was that 213 (53.0%) people were employed full-time, 87 (21.6%) were part-time, and 15 (3.7%) were unemployed.

Brooklands-Spencerville statistical area

Brooklands-Spencerville had a population of 735 at the 2018 New Zealand census, a decrease of 399 people (-35.2%) since the 2013 census, and a decrease of 1,011 people (-57.9%) since the 2006 census. There were 240 households. There were 372 males and 366 females, giving a sex ratio of 1.02 males per female. The median age was 39.7 years (compared with 37.4 years nationally), with 144 people (19.6%) aged under 15 years, 156 (21.2%) aged 15 to 29, 369 (50.2%) aged 30 to 64, and 66 (9.0%) aged 65 or older.

Ethnicities were 89.4% European/Pākehā, 11.8% Māori, 2.9% Pacific peoples, 5.3% Asian, and 2.4% other ethnicities (totals add to more than 100% since people could identify with multiple ethnicities).

The proportion of people born overseas was 19.6%, compared with 27.1% nationally.

Although some people objected to giving their religion, 55.9% had no religion, 32.2% were Christian, 0.4% were Hindu, 0.4% were Buddhist and 1.6% had other religions.

Of those at least 15 years old, 111 (18.8%) people had a bachelor or higher degree, and 99 (16.8%) people had no formal qualifications. The median income was $36,000, compared with $31,800 nationally. The employment status of those at least 15 was that 315 (53.3%) people were employed full-time, 129 (21.8%) were part-time, and 18 (3.0%) were unemployed.

References 

Suburbs of Christchurch
Populated places in Canterbury, New Zealand